Wanchai Kiatmuu9 is a Thai Muay Thai fighter.

Titles and accomplishments
Lumpinee Stadium
 2008 Lumpinee Stadium 105 lbs Champion
 2010 Lumpinee Stadium 105 lbs Champion
 2013 Lumpinee Stadium 108 lbs Champion
 2015 Lumpinee Stadium 108 lbs Champion
Professional Boxing Association of Thailand (PAT) 
 2012 Thailand 108 lbs Champion

Muay Thai record

|-  style="background:#fbb;"
| 2018-03-12|| Loss ||align=left| Petchawarit Sor.Jitpattana || Petchyindee, Rajadamnern Stadium || Bangkok, Thailand || Decision || 5 || 3:00

|-  style="background:#fbb;"
| 2017-11-01|| Loss ||align=left| Sirichai Klongsuanpluresort || Wanmeechai, Rajadamnern Stadium || Bangkok, Thailand || Decision || 5 || 3:00

|-  style="background:#fbb;"
| 2017-05-12|| Loss ||align=left| Satanmuanglek PetchyindeeAcademy || True4U Muaymanwansuk, Rangsit Stadium || Rangsit, Thailand || KO || 4 ||

|-  style="text-align:center; background:#cfc;"
| 2017-04-05|| Win ||align=left| Diesellek Wor.Wanchai || Petchyindee || Thailand || Decision || 5 || 3:00

|-  style="background:#fbb;"
| 2017-03-03|| Loss||align=left| Sam-D PetchyindeeAcademy || Rangsit Stadium || Rangsit, Thailand || Decision ||5 || 3:00

|-  style="background:#fbb;"
| 2017-01-27|| Loss ||align=left| Satanmuanglek PetchyindeeAcademy || True4U Muaymanwansuk, Rangsit Stadium || Rangsit, Thailand || Decision || 5 || 3:00 
|-
! style=background:white colspan=9 |

|-  style="background:#fbb;"
| 2016-11-16|| Loss ||align=left| Sarawut Pitakparpadaeng || Petchaopraya, Jitmuangnon Stadium ||Nonthaburi, Thailand || Decision || 5 || 3:00

|-  style="background:#cfc;"
| 2016-08-31|| Win ||align=left| Luktemroy Visutjaroenyon|| Sor.Sommai, Rajadamnern Stadium || Bangkok, Thailand || Decision || 5 || 3:00

|-  style="background:#fbb;"
| 2016-07-06|| Loss ||align=left| Kiewpayak Jitmuangnon || Rajadamnern Stadium ||Bangkok, Thailand || Decision || 5 || 3:00

|-  style="background:#fbb;"
| 2016-05-09|| Loss ||align=left| Palangpon PetchyindeeAcademy || Wanmeechai, Rajadamnern Stadium || Bangkok, Thailand || Decision || 5 || 3:00

|-  style="background:#fbb;"
| 2016-03-22|| Loss ||align=left| Satanmuanglek Numponthep || Lumpinee Stadium || Bangkok, Thailand || Decision || 5 || 3:00

|-  style="background:#fbb;"
| 2016-02-29|| Loss ||align=left| Sirichai Klongsuanpluresort || Phetwiset, Lumpinee Stadium || Bangkok, Thailand || Decision || 5 || 3:00

|-  style="background:#cfc;"
| 2016-02-08|| Win||align=left| Sam-D PetchyindeeAcademy ||Rajadamnern Stadium || Bangkok, Thailand || Decision || 5 || 3:00

|-  style="background:#cfc;"
| 2015-12-25|| Win ||align=left| Nongyot Sitjekan || Lumpinee Stadium || Bangkok, Thailand || Decision || 5 || 3:00

|-  style="background:#cfc;"
| 2015-11-30|| Win ||align=left| Palangpon PetchyindeeAcademy || Wanmeechai, Rajadamnern Stadium || Bangkok, Thailand || Decision || 5 || 3:00

|-  style="background:#cfc;"
| 2015-11-02|| Win ||align=left| Satanmuanglek Numponthep || Rajadamnern Stadium || Bangkok, Thailand || Decision || 5 || 3:00

|-  style="background:#fbb;"
| 2015-10-07|| Loss ||align=left| Palangpon PetchyindeeAcademy || Wanmeechai, Rajadamnern Stadium || Bangkok, Thailand || Decision || 5 || 3:00

|-  style="background:#c5d2ea;"
| 2015-09-09 || Draw||align=left| Achanai Petchyindee || Wanmeetchai, Rajadamnern Stadium || Bangkok, Thailand || Decision || 5 || 3:00

|-  style="background:#cfc;"
| 2015-08-11 || Win||align=left| Rungkit Wor.Sanprapai || Lumpinee Stadium || Bangkok, Thailand || Decision || 5 || 3:00

|-  style="background:#fbb;"
| 2015-07-20|| Loss ||align=left| Yothin FA Group || Phetwiset || Thailand || Decision  || 5 || 3:00

|-  style="background:#fbb;"
| 2015-06-11|| Loss ||align=left| Satanmuanglek Numponthep || Wan Kingthong, Rajadamnern Stadium || Bangkok, Thailand || Decision || 5 || 3:00

|-  style="background:#fbb;"
| 2015-05-05|| Loss ||align=left| Sirichai Klongsuanpluresort || Petchyindee, Lumpinee Stadium || Bangkok, Thailand || Decision || 5 || 3:00

|-  style="background:#cfc;"
| 2015-04-02|| Win||align=left| Sam-D PetchyindeeAcademy || Rajadamnern Stadium || Bangkok, Thailand || Decision || 5 || 3:00

|-  style="background:#cfc;"
| 2015-03-06|| Win ||align=left| Satanmuanglek Numponthep || Lumpinee Stadium || Bangkok, Thailand || Decision || 5 || 3:00
|-
! style=background:white colspan=9 |

|-  style="background:#cfc;"
| 2015-01-26|| Win||align=left| Sam-D PetchyindeeAcademy || Phetwiset, Rajadamnern Stadium || Bangkok, Thailand || Decision || 5 || 3:00

|-  style="background:#cfc;"
| 2014-10-28|| Win ||align=left| Palangpon PetchyindeeAcademy || Petchyindee, Lumpinee Stadium || Bangkok, Thailand || Decision || 5 || 3:00

|-  style="background:#fbb;"
| 2014-09-29|| Loss ||align=left| Sirichai Klongsuanpluresort || Phetwiset, Rajadamnern Stadium || Bangkok, Thailand || Decision || 5 || 3:00

|-  style="background:#cfc;"
| 2014-08-28|| Win ||align=left| Thanadet Thor.Pran49 || Waan Kingthong, Rajadamnern Stadium || Bangkok, Thailand || Decision || 5 || 3:00

|-  style="background:#cfc;"
| 2014-07-31|| Win ||align=left| Ruengsak Sitniwat || Phetwiset, Rajadamnern Stadium || Bangkok, Thailand || Decision || 5 || 3:00

|-  style="background:#fbb;"
| 2014-07-06|| Loss ||align=left| Satanmuanglek Janevitkorsang || Aswindam, Ladprao Stadium || Thailand || Decision || 5 || 3:00

|-  style="background:#fbb;"
| 2014-06-11|| Loss ||align=left| Palangpon PetchyindeeAcademy || Phetwiset Rajadamnern Stadium  || Bangkok, Thailand || Decision || 5 || 3:00

|-  style="background:#fbb;"
| 2014-05-08|| Loss ||align=left| Sam-D PetchyindeeAcademy ||Rajadamnern Stadium || Bangkok, Thailand || Decision || 5 || 3:00

|-  style="background:#cfc;"
| 2014-04-04|| Win ||align=left| Satanmuanglek WindySport ||  || Songkhla Province, Thailand || Decision || 5 || 3:00

|-  style="background:#fbb;"
| 2014-03-05|| Loss||align=left| Ruengsak Sitniwat || OneSongChai || Nakhon Ratchasima, Thailand || Decision || 5 || 3:00

|-  style="background:#fbb;"
| 2014-01-03|| Loss ||align=left| Ruengsak Sitniwat || Petchyindee, Lumpinee Stadium || Bangkok, Thailand || Decision || 5 || 3:00

|-  style="background:#cfc;"
| 2013-12-03|| Win ||align=left| Detkart Por.Pongsawang || Lumpinee Champion Krikkrai, Lumpinee Stadium || Bangkok, Thailand || Decision || 5 || 3:00
|-
! style=background:white colspan=9 |

|-  style="background:#cfc;"
| 2013-10-10|| Win ||align=left| Satanmuanglek WindySport || Rajadamnern Stadium || Bangkok, Thailand || Decision || 5 || 3:00

|-  style="background:#cfc;"
| 2013-09-04|| Win ||align=left| Palangpon Por Thairungruangkamai || Phetwiset + Wanmeechai, Rajadamnern Stadium || Bangkok, Thailand || Decision || 5 || 3:00

|-  style="background:#cfc;"
| 2013-07-30|| Win||align=left| Chaisiri Sakniranrat || Petchyindee, Lumpinee Stadium || Bangkok, Thailand || Decision || 5 || 3:00

|-  style="background:#fbb;"
| 2013-06-12|| Loss||align=left| Sam-D PetchyindeeAcademy ||Rajadamnern Stadium || Bangkok, Thailand || Decision || 5 || 3:00

|-  style="background:#fbb;"
| 2013-05-09|| Loss||align=left| Satanmuanglek WindySport || Rajadamnern Stadium || Bangkok, Thailand || Decision || 5 || 3:00

|-  style="background:#cfc;"
| 2013-03-13|| Win ||align=left| Yuttasak Sakburiram || Phetwiset, Rajadamnern Stadium || Bangkok, Thailand || Decision || 5 || 3:00

|-  style="background:#fbb;"
| 2013-01-22|| Loss||align=left| Sam-D PetchyindeeAcademy ||Lumpinee Stadium || Bangkok, Thailand || KO (Left Elbow) || 3 ||

|-  style="background:#fbb;"
| 2012-12-19|| Loss||align=left| Wanchana Or.Boonchuay || Wanmeechai, Rajadamnern Stadium || Bangkok, Thailand || Decision || 5 || 3:00

|-  style="background:#fbb;"
| 2012-11-02|| Loss||align=left| Sam-D PetchyindeeAcademy || Lumpinee Stadium || Bangkok, Thailand || Decision || 5 || 3:00

|-  style="background:#fbb;"
| 2012-10-04|| Loss||align=left| Newlukrak ExcindiconGym || Wanmeechai, Rajadamnern Stadium || Bangkok, Thailand || Decision || 5 || 3:00

|-  style="background:#fbb;"
| 2012-09-07|| Loss ||align=left| Sarawut Pitakparpadaeng || Lumpinee Champion Krikkrai, Lumpinee Stadium || Bangkok, Thailand || Decision || 5 || 3:00
|-
! style=background:white colspan=9 |

|-  style="background:#cfc;"
| 2012-06-08|| Win ||align=left| Sarawut Phithakpaphadaeng || Lumpinee Champion Krikkrai, Lumpinee Stadium || Bangkok, Thailand || Decision (Unanimous)|| 5 || 3:00
|-
! style=background:white colspan=9 |

|-  style="background:#cfc;"
| 2012-04-03|| Win ||align=left| Detkart Por.Pongsawang || Petchyindee, Lumpinee Stadium || Bangkok, Thailand || Decision (Unanimous)|| 5 || 3:00
|-
! style=background:white colspan=9 |

|-  style="background:#fbb;"
| 2012-03-02 || Loss||align=left| Superlek Kiatmuu9  || Saengsawanphantpla, Lumpinee Stadium || Bangkok, Thailand || Decision || 5 || 3:00

|-  style="background:#cfc;"
| 2012-02-03 || Win ||align=left| Superlek Kiatmuu9 || Petchpiya, Lumpinee Stadium || Bangkok, Thailand || Decision || 5 || 3:00

|-  style="background:#cfc;"
| 2012-01-11|| Win ||align=left| ET Petchsomnuek || Wankingthong, Rajadamnern Stadium || Bangkok, Thailand || Decision || 5 || 3:00

|-  style="background:#cfc;"
| 2011-11-25|| Win ||align=left| ET Petchsomnuek || Petchyindee, Lumpinee Stadium || Bangkok, Thailand || Decision || 5 || 3:00

|-  style="background:#fbb;"
| 2011-10-11 || Loss ||align=left| Songkhom Sakhomsila || Petchyindee, Lumpinee Stadium || Bangkok, Thailand || KO || 2 ||

|-  style="background:#cfc;"
| 2011-09-13|| Win ||align=left| Petchchatchai Charoraioi || Petchpiya, Lumpinee Stadium || Bangkok, Thailand || Decision || 5 || 3:00

|-  style="background:#cfc;"
| 2011-08-23|| Win ||align=left| Petchchatchai Charoraioi || Petchyindee, Lumpinee Stadium || Bangkok, Thailand || Decision|| 5 || 3:00

|-  style="background:#cfc;"
| 2011-05-10|| Win ||align=left| Thelek Wor.Sangprapai || Petchyindee, Lumpinee Stadium || Bangkok, Thailand || Decision|| 5 || 3:00

|-  style="background:#fbb;"
| 2011-03-25 || Loss ||align=left| Phetmorakok Wor.Sangprapai || Lumpinee Stadium || Bangkok, Thailand || Decision || 5 || 3:00
|-
! style=background:white colspan=9 |

|-  style="background:#fbb;"
| 2011-02-25|| Loss ||align=left| Thelek Wor.Sangprapai || Petchyindee, Lumpinee Stadium || Bangkok, Thailand || Decision || 5 || 3:00

|-  style="background:#cfc;"
| 2011-01-04|| Win ||align=left| Hongthonglek Phithakhongthong || Petchyindee, Lumpinee Stadium || Bangkok, Thailand || Decision || 5 || 3:00

|-  style="background:#fbb;"
| 2010-11-23|| Loss ||align=left| Khunsuk PN Gym || Fairtex, Lumpinee Stadium || Bangkok, Thailand || Decision || 5 || 3:00

|-  style="background:#cfc;"
| 2010-10-08|| Win ||align=left| Aiyara Muangsurin || Weerapol, Lumpinee Stadium || Bangkok, Thailand || Decision || 5 || 3:00

|-  style="background:#cfc;"
| 2010-08-24|| Win ||align=left| Phetnakhon Sor.LaddaGym || Petchyindee, Lumpinee Stadium || Bangkok, Thailand || Decision || 5 || 3:00

|-  style="background:#fbb;"
| 2010-07-09|| Loss ||align=left| Mondam Sor.Weerapol || Petchyindee, Lumpinee Stadium || Bangkok, Thailand || Decision || 5 || 3:00

|-  style="background:#fbb;"
| 2010-05-04|| Loss ||align=left| Chaidet Sor.Suriya || Petchyindee, Lumpinee Stadium || Bangkok, Thailand || KO || 4 ||

|-  style="background:#cfc;"
| 2010-03-05|| Win ||align=left| Prakaypetch Kiatpratum || Lumpinee Champion Krikkrai, Lumpinee Stadium || Bangkok, Thailand || Decision || 5 || 3:00
|-
! style=background:white colspan=9 |

|-  style="background:#cfc;"
| 2010-01-30|| Win ||align=left| Siangmorakot Kiatrachanok || Omnoi Stadium || Bangkok, Thailand || Decision || 5 || 3:00

|-  style="background:#fbb;"
| 2009-12-29|| Loss ||align=left| Mapichit Sitsongpeenong || Petchyindee, Lumpinee Stadium || Bangkok, Thailand || Decision || 5 || 3:00
|-
! style=background:white colspan=9 |

|-  style="background:#cfc;"
| 2009-11-11|| Win ||align=left| Saengmorakot Tawan || Rajadamnern Stadium || Bangkok, Thailand || Decision || 5 || 3:00

|-  style="background:#cfc;"
| 2009-10-06|| Win ||align=left| Siriphet 96Peenang || Lumpinee Stadium || Bangkok, Thailand || Decision || 5 || 3:00

|-  style="background:#fbb;"
| 2009-09-01|| Loss ||align=left| Choknamchai Sitjakung || Petchyindee, Lumpinee Stadium || Bangkok, Thailand || Decision || 5 || 3:00

|-  style="background:#cfc;"
| 2009-08-07|| Win ||align=left| Choknamchai Sitjakung || Petchpiya, Lumpinee Stadium || Bangkok, Thailand || Decision || 5 || 3:00

|-  style="background:#c5d2ea;"
| 2009-07-01|| Draw||align=left| Choknamchai Sitjakung || Rajadamnern Stadium || Bangkok, Thailand || Decision || 5 || 3:00

|-  style="background:#fbb;"
| 2009-05-22|| Loss ||align=left| Pornsawan Porpramook || Por.Pramuk, Lumpinee Stadium || Bangkok, Thailand || KO || 1 ||

|-  style="background:#cfc;"
| 2009-02-13|| Win ||align=left| Yodngoen Tor.Chalermchai || Petchyindee, Rajadamnern Stadium || Bangkok, Thailand || Decision || 5 || 3:00

|-  style="background:#cfc;"
| 2008-12-10|| Win ||align=left| Fahmongkol Saengtawee || Sor.Sommai, Rajadamnern Stadium || Bangkok, Thailand || Decision || 5 || 3:00

|-  style="background:#fbb;"
| 2008-09-30|| Loss ||align=left| Sailomnoi Tded99 || Lumpinee Champion Krikkrai, Lumpinee Stadium || Bangkok, Thailand || Decision || 5 || 3:00

|-  style="background:#cfc;"
| 2008-08-29|| Win ||align=left| Jingreedtong TwinsSpecial || Petchyindee, Lumpinee Stadium || Bangkok, Thailand || Decision || 5 || 3:00

|-  style="background:#fbb;"
| 2008-07-04|| Loss ||align=left| Thanusuklek Or.Kwanmuang || Lumpinee Champion Krikkrai, Lumpinee Stadium || Bangkok, Thailand || KO || 2 ||

|-  style="background:#fbb;"
| 2008-06-04|| Loss ||align=left| Thanusuklek Or.Kwanmuang || Sor.Sommai, Rajadamnern Stadium || Bangkok, Thailand || KO || 1 ||

|-  style="background:#cfc;"
| 2008-05-10|| Win ||align=left| Duangpikthak Kor Saphaothong || Omnoi Stadium || Bangkok, Thailand || Decision || 5 || 3:00

|-  style="background:#cfc;"
| 2008-03-28|| Win ||align=left| Nongbonlek Sitmutu || Lumpinee Champion Krikkrai, Lumpinee Stadium || Bangkok, Thailand || Decision || 5 || 3:00
|-
! style=background:white colspan=9 |

|-  style="background:#cfc;"
| 2008-02-29|| Win ||align=left| Fahmongkol Saengtawee || Petchpiya, Lumpinee Stadium || Bangkok, Thailand || Decision || 5 || 3:00

|-  style="background:#fbb;"
| 2007-12-28|| Loss ||align=left| Yodpetch Sitpadao || Petchpiya, Lumpinee Stadium || Bangkok, Thailand || Decision || 5 || 3:00

|-  style="background:#fbb;"
| 2007-11-06|| Loss ||align=left| Fahrungruang Sor.Poolsawat || Petchpiya, Lumpinee Stadium || Bangkok, Thailand || Decision || 5 || 3:00

|-  style="background:#fbb;"
| 2007-06-15|| Loss ||align=left| Chokchuay PetsiriGym || Petchpiya, Lumpinee Stadium || Bangkok, Thailand || KO || 4 ||

|-  style="background:#cfc;"
| 2007-04-23|| Win ||align=left| Jomwo Chor.Pailee || Sor.Sommai, Rajadamnern Stadium || Bangkok, Thailand || Decision || 5 || 3:00

|-  style="background:#;"
| 2007-03-09|| ||align=left| Nongbonlek Sitmutu || Petchyindee, Lumpinee Stadium || Bangkok, Thailand || ||  ||

|-  style="background:#c5d2ea;"
| 2007-01-30|| Draw||align=left| Nongbonlek Sitmutu || Petchyindee, Lumpinee Stadium || Bangkok, Thailand || Decision || 5 || 3:00
|-
| colspan=9 | Legend:

References

Wanchai Kiatmuu9
Living people
1987 births
Wanchai Kiatmuu9